The men's bantamweight (58 kilograms) event at the 1986 Asian Games took place on 1 October 1986 at Sungkyunkwan University, Seoul, South Korea.

A total of twelve competitors competed in this event, limited to fighters whose body weight was less than 58 kilograms.

Schedule
All times are Korea Standard Time (UTC+09:00)

Results 
Legend
PTS — Won by points

References

External links
Medalists
Results

Taekwondo at the 1986 Asian Games